István Veréb (born 8 October 1987) is a Hungarian freestyle wrestler. He participated in Men's freestyle 74 kg at the 2008 Summer Olympics. He was eliminated from the competition after he lost to Ben Askren  in the 1/16 finals.

In March 2021, he competed at the European Qualification Tournament in Budapest, Hungary hoping to qualify for the 2020 Summer Olympics in Tokyo, Japan.

Mixed martial arts career

Vereb made his professional debut  on a Fight Arena Hungary card on September 9th, 2017 He won the fight via decesion against Kalman Kovacs.

Vereb faced Zarko Golubovic on Real Fight Arena 4 on October 9th, 2022, he won the fight in the first round via submission.

Vereb faced Michal Dobiaš on February 4, 2023 at Real Fight Arena 8, losing the bout via guillotine choke in the second round.

Mixed martial arts record 

|-
| Loss
| align=center| 2–1
| Michal Dobiaš
| Submission (guillotine choke)
| Real Fight Arena 8
| 
| align=center|2
| align=center|1:05
| Budapest, Hungary
|
|-
| Win
| align=center| 2–0
| Zarko Golubovic
| Submission (neck crank)
| Real Fight Arena 4
| 
| align=center| 1
| align=center| 3:31
| Košice, Slovakia
|
|-
| Win
| align=center| 1–0
| Kalman Kovacs
| Decision (split)
| Fight Arena Hungary
| 
| align=center| 3
| align=center| 5:00
| Székesfehérvár, Hungary
| Middleweight debut.
|

References

External links
 Wrestler bio on beijing2008.com
 

Living people
1987 births
Hungarian male sport wrestlers
Olympic wrestlers of Hungary
Wrestlers at the 2008 Summer Olympics
Wrestlers at the 2015 European Games
Wrestlers at the 2016 Summer Olympics
European Games competitors for Hungary
World Wrestling Championships medalists
European Wrestling Championships medalists
Sportspeople from Szombathely
21st-century Hungarian people